George Francis Willmot BA FSA (1908–1977) was a British archaeologist and curator based in York

Early life
George Willmot was the son of a solicitor from Bournemouth. He undertook archaeological fieldwork from an early age, as at age 19 he discovered an Anglo-Saxon cemetery site at Abington, Berkshire. He attended Oxford University before teaching in Bedford and, later, Ampleforth before the War.

World War II
During the Second World War, Willmot served with the rank of Major with the Monuments, Fine Arts, and Archives program (MFAA) as one of the so-called 'Monuments Men'. He was responsible for MFAA activities in Hamburg, Germany, and worked on various projects including St. Catherine's Church and St. Michael's Church. Throughout 1946 and 1947 he remained in Europe with the MFAA, working first in Düsseldorf and then in Hanover.

Keeper of the Yorkshire Museum
From May 1950, Willmot was employed by the Yorkshire Philosophical Society as Keeper of the Yorkshire Museum; a position he held until his retirement through ill-health in 1970. He worked on various aspects of the collection, including the redisplay of the Bird Gallery in 1951 and the Roman Gallery in 1958 (after a £350 grant from the Carnegie Trust, and opened by Sir Ian Richmond), and research and improved storage of the important Geological 'type and figured' specimens.

He was elected a Fellow of the Society of Antiquaries of London on 3 May 1951.

Excavation and research
Academically, Willmot undertook important and pioneering work on Bronze Age beakers that was never fully published as well as directing numerous excavations of prehistoric sites in Britain and Ireland. In 1963, Willmot excavated All Saints' Church (High Ousegate, York).

Between 1952-56, Willmot undertook a series of excavations in the western part of St. Mary's Abbey, continuing previous excavation on the site by Charles Wellbeloved and Walter Harvey Brook. The results of these excavations were also never formally published and exist only as unpublished notes and short reviews. The excavations in the abbey utilised volunteer excavators drawn from the members of the Yorkshire Philosophical Society and students of Bootham School and extended beneath the abbey to include Pre-Norman and Roman levels.

Ian Stead dedicated his 1979 book The Arras Culture to George Willmot. The dedication reads: "To the memory of George Francis Willmost, lately Keeper of the Yorkshire Museum, who pursued original research throughout Europe and encouraged many an aspiring archaeologist, this book is gratefully dedicated".

See also
St. Mary's Abbey
Yorkshire Museum
Yorkshire Philosophical Society
York Museum Gardens
History of York
Elizabeth Hartley – Keeper of Archaeology at the Yorkshire Museum (1971–2007)

References

1908 births
British archaeologists
British curators
1977 deaths
Fellows of the Society of Antiquaries of London
20th-century archaeologists
Yorkshire Museum people
Monuments men
British Army personnel of World War II